Opaka is a town in Targovishte Province in northeast Bulgaria.
Archeologists have found evidence of Thracian, Roman and Slavonic settlements in the area. Near the village of Krepcha, a stone monastery is the site of the oldest known Old Bulgarian Cyrillic inscription, dated from around 920 CE. A 2nd century Thracian tumulus containing various artifacts, including six leaves of a golden wreath and bronze figurines, was excavated in 2011.

It is the seat of Opaka Municipality.

Honour
Opaka Rocks off Robert Island, South Shetland Islands are named after Opaka.

References

External links

Towns in Bulgaria
Populated places in Targovishte Province